Sundar Popo HBM, born Sundarlal Popo Bahora (4 November 1943 – 2 May 2000) was a Trinidadian and Tobagonian musician. He is credited as being the father of Chutney music, beginning with his 1969 hit Nana and Nani.

Early life 
Popo was born on 4 November 1943 in Monkey Town, Barrackpore, Trinidad and Tobago into a Hindu Indo-Trinidadian family. He grew up in a musical family. Both his parents were musicians; his mother was a singer and his father was an accomplished tassa drummer. At the age of 15, he began singing bhajans at mandirs and weddings in his hometown for 15 to 30 cents a show. Popo worked as a watchman at a Barrackpore factory, and trained in music under the Indian classical singer Ustad James Ramsawak.

Career 
In 1969, at a mattikoor in Princes Town, he met Moean Mohammed, a radio host and promoter. After listening to Nani and Nana, a song with lyrics in both Trinidadian Hindustani and Trinidadian English, describing the daily lives of an Indian maternal grandmother (Nani) and maternal grandfather (Nana), Mohammed got maestro Harry Mahabir to record the song at Television House, accompanied by the British West Indies Airways (BWIA) National Indian Orchestra. The song revolutionized Indian music in Trinidad and Tobago. After the success of Nani and Nana, Popo devoted more of his time to his singing career. He followed Nani and Nana with an album combining local Trinidadian music with traditional Indian folk music. In total, he recorded more than 15 albums. He is best known for his song Scorpion Gyul, which spoke about love, death, and happiness. His other hits include Oh My Lover, Caroni Gyal (also known as Ladies and Gentlemen), Don't Fall in Love, Parbatee, Surajie My Darlin''', Awoh My Darling, Pholourie Bina Chutney (also known as Kaise Bani), Your Mother's Love, Ratiya May Dulaha, Hum Na Jaibe, Phoolbasiya, Chalbo Ke Nahin, Subhagie Gyul, Is You and You Alone Gyul, Naina Bandh, Hamaray Lal, Dulaha Ke Maiya, Bahuwa Cheleli, Chal ka Chal, Kahaa Gayaa Gori Naina May Jadu Dar Kay, Baujie Rahan Chalan, Barasaatawa May Bangala, Sagar Paniya, Chaadar Beechawo Baalma, Ab Na Jaibe, Jo Bolay Saiya, Indian Arrival, Giyara Jargail Hamar, Chahay Bolo, Aao Chalo Bhaiyo aur Beheno Mastana Bahar (also known as  Trinidad and Tobago Land of Calypso), Saiyan Toray, Aaj Mere Dost ke Aya Janamdin (also known as Happy Birthday), Aaye Re (also known as Diwali Bhajan), Rampersad, and Saas More Lage (also known as I Wish I Was A Virgin). Babla and Kanchan had success with their version of his "Pholourie Bina Chutney".

After the release of Nani and Nana, he followed up shortly in the mid 1970s with a string of popular singles and appearances on Mastana Bahar and the Indian Cultural Pageants. His singles were then released on his first LP, Come Dance With The Champ (1979). Through Moean's Mohammed's Windsor Records, his singles and early 1980s LPs were distributed throughout the Caribbean, South America, North America and Europe with assistance from Rohit Jagessar and various other producers and record store owners. By the late 1980s, he started making frequent appearances outside of the Caribbean to perform. He appeared as a headliner in New York. He performed with international Indian stars Babla and Kanchan, Anup Jalota, Amitabh Bachchan, and Kishore Kumar. Popo also performed with numerous Chutney artists and other Trinidadian and Caribbean artists.

Popo won many awards during his career, and in 1995 Black Stalin won the Trinidad and Tobago Calypso Monarch title with his Tribute to Sundar Popo. There are also other tributes to Popo done by Devannand Gatto, Terry Gajraj, Rikki Jai, Ravi Bissambhar, Brian Mohan, Anthony Batson, Superblue, Dave Lall, Drupatee Ramgoonai, and Chris Garcia. In addition to his solo albums, Popo has also released collaborations with Babla and Kanchan, Anand Yankarran (brother of Rakesh Yankarran), and JMC Triveni.

 Death and legacy 

While Popo had recorded and performed prolifically since the late 1960s, failing health and eyesight forced him to slow down. At the 2000 Chutney Monarch competition, his performance had to be cut short after one song, and he played his final concert on 1 April 2000, in Connecticut. On 2 May 2000, he died at the home he had built on Lal Beharry Trace in Monkey Town, Barrackpore from heart and kidney ailments relating to diabetes. His funeral was attended by Trinidad and Tobago Prime Minister, Basdeo Panday. He is survived by his three sons Hemant, Harripersad, and Jaiknath Sundar, and his daughter Sundari. Popo's granddaughters, Chandra and Natasha Sundar, are now following in their grandfather's footsteps in singing. An auditorium called Sundarlal Popo Bahora Auditorium is named after him at the Southern Academy for the Performing Arts (SAPA) in San Fernando. At that same auditorium, a play called "Sundar" is about Popo's life, produced by Iere Theatre Productions Ltd. Popo's song "Chadar Bichawo Balma" was a song that Amitabh Bachchan incorporated into his medleys on his live stage performances in 1982/83. Sonu Nigam has also done a rendition on Popo's songs. Kalpana Patowary has also resung some of Popo's songs. Popo's song "Pholourie Bina Chutney" was resung and put into the popular Bollywood movie Dabangg 2. There are negotiations going on to rename Monkey Town, the small village Popo was from, to Sundar Popo Village and to rename the street he lived on, Lal Beharry Trace to Sundar Popo Road. There is a statue of Sundar Popo in Debe.

 Awards 

 Four-time winner of the Indian Cultural Pageant
 National Award for Excellence
 Local Song category Indian Cultural Pageant (1976)
 Top Indian vocalist (1988)
 Sunshine Award for first place in Indian Soca (1993)
 King of Chutney in South Florida, United States (1993)
 The National Hummingbird Medal of Trinidad and Tobago (silver) (1993)
 Caribbean Music Award (1994)
 "Caribbean Bachanal" trophy (1996)

 Discography 

 Albums (LPs, EPs and CDs) 
 Come Dance with the Champ – 1979
 Hot & Spicy (with Anup Jalota) – 1980
 Hot & Sweet – 1981
 The Nana and Nani Man Sings Again – 1982
 Sundar Fever – 1985
 The Latest, The Greatest – 1986
 Sundar Soca – 1986
 Indian Soca – 1987
 Screwdriver – 1988
 Oh My Lover – 1989
 Nana & Nani Don't Cry – 1989
 Sundar Popo's Heartbreak – 1990
 Who We Go Bring Back Again? – 1991
 Is The Spaner She Want – 1992
 Sweet Sweet Guyana (with Anand Yankaran)- 1993
 Children Children Respect Your Mother & Father – 1993
 Dance Party King – 1994
 Classic – 1994
 Cool Yuhself With Cold Water – 1995
 Musical Voyage: East Meets West – 1998
 Unity – 1998
 Friends – 2000

 7" and 12" Nana & Nani bw Indian Moments of Treasure – 1969Play You Mas – 1971Scorpion Gyul bw Phuluwrie Bina Chatnee – 1976Caroni Gyul bw Ab Na Jaibay – 1978Come My Darling bw Sabhagie – 1975Hum Najaiba bw Tears in My Eyes – 1978Maa Ka Mohabat bw Don't Fall in Love – 1977Naina Bandh/Chal Ka Chal – 1986Samdhin Tere/Tere Liye'' – 1986

References 

Desi musicians
20th-century Trinidad and Tobago male singers
20th-century Trinidad and Tobago singers
Trinidad and Tobago people of Indian descent
Chutney musicians
1943 births
2000 deaths
Trinidad and Tobago Hindus
Recipients of the Hummingbird Medal